Douglas George Horbul (born July 27, 1952) is a Canadian former ice hockey forward. Most of his career, which lasted from 1972 to 1977, was spent in the minor leagues, but he also played four games in the National Hockey League for the Kansas City Scouts during the 1974–75 season.

Career statistics

Regular season and playoffs

References

External links
 

1952 births
Living people
Baltimore Clippers players
Calgary Centennials players
Canadian ice hockey forwards
Fort Wayne Komets players
Kansas City Scouts players
Ice hockey people from Saskatchewan
New York Rangers draft picks
Omaha Knights (CHL) players
People from Rural Municipality Wreford No. 280, Saskatchewan
Providence Reds players
Rhode Island Reds players
Saskatoon Blades players